This was the first edition of the tournament.

Aliona Bolsova and Rebeka Masarova won the title, defeating Lea Bošković and Daniela Vismane in the final, 6–3, 6–3.

Seeds

Draw

Draw

References

External Links
Main Draw

Open Villa de Madrid - Doubles